John A. Holmes High School is a public high school located in Edenton, North Carolina. The school has a Junior Reserve Officers' Training Corps program.

References

External links

Public high schools in North Carolina
Education in Chowan County, North Carolina